Pacifica (meaning "Peaceful") is a city in San Mateo County, California, on the coast of the Pacific Ocean between San Francisco and Half Moon Bay.

Overview
The City of Pacifica is spread along a  stretch of  sandy coastal beaches and hills in north central California. The city comprises several small valleys spread between Sweeney Ridge in the east, Montara Mountain to the south, and the Pacific Ocean's rocky bluffs to the west.

Pacifica is well known regionally as a popular surfing destination. Surfers and families often visit Linda Mar Beach. Rockaway Beach is a scenic location and offers recreation, shopping and dining. 2005 marked the opening of the top ranked   Pacifica Skateboard Park. Pacifica is also a popular mountain biking destination, with many trails crossing the hillsides that surround the city, including Pedro Mountain Road, Sweeney Ridge, and areas of the Golden Gate National Recreation Area. Fishermen frequent the local beaches and the Pacifica Pier, often catching striped bass and salmon. Pacifica is also a popular place to hike, with many trails that wind along the beaches and bluffs, including Mori Point, San Pedro Valley County Park, the Sanchez Adobe, Milagra Ridge, and the privately owned Pacifica quarry. For live local theater and performing arts, Pacifica Spindrift Players is a local and popular favorite, in addition to Pacifica Performances which regularly provides both musical presentations and performing arts as well. Pacifica is also home to the Sharp Park Golf Course, which was designed in 1931 by architect Alister MacKenzie. The world class bromeliad nursery, Shelldance Orchid Gardens is located just off Highway 1 in Pacifica, adjacent to the Sweeney Ridge hiking trailhead.

Pacifica is divided into roughly eleven districts from north to south:

Fairmont
Westview (Pacific Highlands)
Pacific Manor (Manor)
Edgemar
Sharp Park 
Fairway Park 
Vallemar
 Rockaway Beach
Pedro Point  and Shelter Cove in the south west,
Linda Mar, Linda Mar Valley, (formerly Pedro Valley or San Pedro Valley) in the south.
Park Pacifica in south east portions of the city (called the Back of the Valley).

History

Before European settlers arrived, Pacifica was home to two significant Ohlone Indian villages: Pruristac located at San Pedro Creek near present-day Adobe Drive, and Timigtac on Calera Creek in the Rockaway Beach neighborhood.

Pacifica is the location of the oldest European encounter with the San Francisco Bay. An expedition led by Gaspar de Portolà sighted the bay by climbing the hills of Sweeney Ridge in Pacifica on November 4, 1769. Before then, earlier Spanish maritime explorers of the California coast Juan Cabrillo and Sebastian Vizcaino had missed the San Francisco Bay because heavy fog so frequently shrouded its entrance from the Pacific Ocean (the Golden Gate).  Sighting the San Francisco Bay accelerated the Spanish colonization of Alta California because it was the only large, safe, centrally located harbor on the Alta California coast. The Spanish had known about Monterey Bay since the sixteenth century, but, unlike San Francisco Bay, it was too exposed to rough currents and winds to be used as major harbor for their trade between Asia and Mexico. In the Spanish era, Pacifica was the site of the San Pedro Valley Mission Outpost (1786–1793) of Mission Dolores. That was dissolved when a newly independent Mexico secularized the mission system. Pacifica is also the site of the  still-extant Mexican-era Sánchez Adobe, built in 1846. The city is located on a part of the Mexican land grant Rancho San Pedro given to Francisco Sanchez in 1839.

During World War II, the area around the present-day Sharp Park recreational area held the Sharp Park Detention Center, an INS processing facility for Japanese Americans, Japanese nationals, and other "foreign enemies" during Japanese internment. The Stanford professor Yamato Ichihashi spent six weeks in Sharp Park. He described the facility, writing, "The ground is limited by tall iron net-fences and small in area; barracks 20' x 120' are well-built and painted outside and inside and are regularly arranged; there are 10 of these for inmates, each accommodating about 40, divided into 5 rooms for 8 persons each; if double-decked (beds), 80 can be put in."

On February 20, 1956, an LGBT-friendly bar, Hazel’s Inn in Sharp Park, was raided by police. Sheriff Earl Whitmore told the San Mateo County Times at the time, "The purpose of the raid was to let it be known that we are not going to tolerate gatherings of homosexuals in this county." Ninety people were arrested that night, and the majority were San Francisco residents.

Pacifica was incorporated in 1957, relatively recently in the history of San Mateo County. Its first elected mayor was Jean Fassler, one of the first women mayors in California. It was the union of nine previously separate, unincorporated communities–Fairmont, Westview, Pacific Manor (or just Manor), Sharp Park, Fairway Park, Vallemar, Rockaway Beach, Linda Mar and Pedro Point–some of which were stops on the short-lived Ocean Shore Railroad. The name "Pacifica" was chosen from Thomas Barca, by vote; "Coastside" was a close runner-up. In 1960, the city seal was designed by resident Ralph Barkey, who was inspired by Ralph Stackpole's towering "Pacifica" statue produced for the 1939–1940 Golden Gate International Exposition on Treasure Island in the San Francisco Bay.

Geography

Topography
Pacifica straddles San Pedro Creek which flows from the western slope of Sweeney Ridge. The far eastern portion of Pacifica includes San Andreas Creek which flows down the eastern slope of Sweeney Ridge. The Portola expedition followed these two creeks in the discovery of San Francisco Bay. Calera Creek runs through Pacifica Quarry and is protected as ESHA Environmentally Sensitive Habitat.

Climate

Pacifica has a warm summer Mediterranean climate (Köppen climate classification Csb) typical of coastal areas of California.
The National Weather Service has maintained a cooperative weather station in Pacifica since November 1, 1983. There are an average of 3.0 days with highs of 90 °F (32 °C) or higher and an average of 0.2 day with lows of 32 °F (0 °C) or lower. There are an average of 66 days annually with measurable precipitation, most of which falls from October through May. Summer fogs often produce light drizzle in the night and morning hours. Condensation from the fogs also produces fog drip from trees overnight. No measurable snowfall has been recorded since records began. The southeastern portions of the municipality, such as Park Pacifica, are known to be much sunnier than the rest of the city.

Demographics

2010
At the 2010 census Pacifica had a population of 37,234. The racial makeup of Pacifica was 55.6% white, 16.8% (6,243) Hispanic or Latino of any race, 976 (2.6%) African American, 206 (0.6%) Native American, 7,230 (19.4%) Asian, 315 (0.8%) Pacific Islander, 1,703 (4.6%) from other races, and 2,638 (7.1%) from two or more races.

The census reported that 37,052 people (99.5% of the population) lived in households, 64 (0.2%) lived in non-institutionalized group quarters, and 118 (0.3%) were institutionalized.

There were 13,967 households, 4,511 (32.3%) had children under the age of 18 living in them, 7,385 (52.9%) were opposite-sex married couples living together, 1,592 (11.4%) had a female householder with no husband present, 709 (5.1%) had a male householder with no wife present.  There were 869 (6.2%) unmarried opposite-sex partnerships, and 237 (1.7%) same-sex married couples or partnerships. 3,126 households (22.4%) were one person and 1,098 (7.9%) had someone living alone who was 65 or older. The average household size was 2.65.  There were 9,686 families (69.3% of households); the average family size was 3.12.

The age distribution was 7,707 people (20.7%) under the age of 18, 2,842 people (7.6%) aged 18 to 24, 10,011 people (26.9%) aged 25 to 44, 12,155 people (32.6%) aged 45 to 64, and 4,519 people (12.1%) who were 65 or older.  The median age was 41.5 years. For every 100 females, there were 95.6 males.  For every 100 females age 18 and over, there were 93.4 males.

There were 14,523 housing units at an average density of 1,147.2 per square mile, of the occupied units 9,545 (68.3%) were owner-occupied and 4,422 (31.7%) were rented. The homeowner vacancy rate was 0.9%; the rental vacancy rate was 4.8%.  26,567 people (71.4% of the population) lived in owner-occupied housing units and 10,485 people (28.2%) lived in rental housing units.

2000
At the 2000 census there were 38,390 people in 13,994 households, including 9,655 families, in the city.

Of the 13,994 households 32.0% had children under the age of 18 living with them, 53.5% were married couples living together, 11.0% had a female householder with no husband present, and 31.0% were non-families. 21.2% of households were one person and 6.4% were one person aged 65 or older.  The average household size was 2.73 and the average family size was 3.21.

The age distribution was 23.2% under the age of 18, 7.7% from 18 to 24, 32.8% from 25 to 44, 26.6% from 45 to 64, and 9.7% 65 or older.  The median age was 38 years. For every 100 females, there were 97.2 males.  For every 100 females age 18 and over, there were 95.2 males.

The median income for a household in the city was $31,737, and the median family income  was $48,361 (these figures had risen to $52,000 and $62,463 respectively as of a 2007 estimate). Males had a median income of $50,761 versus $40,261 for females. The per capita income for the city was $30,183.  About 1.2% of families and 2.9% of the population were below the poverty line, including 1.2% of those under age 18 and 4.9% of those age 65 or over.

The oldest person to ever live in Pacifica is Rose G. Rosenthal who was born on April 8, 1901, and died December 27, 2008.

The Reverend Herschell Harkins Memorial pier was constructed in 1973 and was designed to carry sewage piping out to sea. It was closed in 1992 due to corrosion of some of the structure.  Since then the pier has been repaired and is a well known fishing spot; on July 8–9, 1995, over 1,000 salmon were caught from the pier.

Economy

Top employers

According to the city's 2019 Comprehensive Annual Financial Report, the top employers in the city are:

Government
Governed by a city council of five elected members, with each council seat in turn serving as mayor for a one-year term.  A city manager, city attorney and city clerk are appointed and serve in support of the council to enact the ordinances passed by the council, which meets biweekly on the second and fourth Mondays of the month.

Departments

The major City departments, ranked by cost:
 32% - Police and Communication Services
 23% - Fire and Emergency Services
  6% - Development and Engineering
  6% - Childcare programs
  5% - City Attorney
  5% - Public Works
  5% - Parks, Beach & Recreation
  5% - Finance and MIS
As of August 1, 2011, the South San Francisco Police Department took over the Pacifica emergency calls dispatch.

State and federal representation

According to the California Secretary of State, as of February 10, 2019, Pacifica has 25,029 registered voters. Of those, 13,404 (53.6%) are registered Democrats, 3,290 (13.1%) are registered Republicans, and 7,154 (28.6%) have declined to state a political party.

Media
The local weekly newspaper, the Pacifica Tribune, is mailed out every Wednesday. It is part of Coastside News Group, a locally-owned California Benefit Corporation that includes the Half Moon Bay Review  and Coastside Magazine. It originated as the Coastside Tribune early in the twentieth century.

Other media include:
 The San Mateo Daily Journal
 The Coastsider,
 Coastside Magazine, published by the award-winning Half Moon Bay Review,
 Pacificariptide,
 Peninsula Press - a project of Stanford_journalism.

Pacifica Community Television, Pacifica's Emmy Award-winning local public-access television cable TV channel 26, has continuously operated for 30 years, featuring community based television.

The pornographic movie The Pleasures of a Woman (1972), directed by Nick Millard, was partially shot on location at Coral Ridge Drive in the Edgemar district and on Rockaway Beach.

Education

Primary and secondary schools
The public elementary and middle school district, known as Pacifica School District, (formerly the Laguna Salada School District), consists of Vallemar, Cabrillo, Ingrid B. Lacy, Sunset Ridge, Ortega, Linda Mar and Ocean Shore schools, and also a home schooling program.  The administration office is located at 375 Reina del Mar Avenue, adjacent to Vallemar School. Each school enrolls about 550-600 students. There are two private K-8 schools, Good Shepherd School and Pacific Bay Christian School, a K-12 school which was founded as a segregation academy.

Pacifica also previously had an established elementary school from 1980 - 2005 known as Oddstad (Oddstad Andres) Elementary located in the Park Pacifica neighborhood. Though now non-operational, the campus site has been host to numerous community events, and private courses as well as sporting events and leisure. 

Pacifica has one private high school and two public high schools which are part of the Jefferson Union High School District.  Oceana High School in the central part of the city while Terra Nova High School and Pacific Bay Christian School are in the south.  Many students in the northern part of Pacifica attend Jefferson High School or Westmoor High School nearby in adjacent Daly City. Oceana's teaching paradigm is geared toward longer classes, senior exhibitions, and mandated community service.  Much larger Terra Nova is a more traditional institution, featuring numerous sports, clubs, and a broad-based and enriching educational experience.

Public libraries
San Mateo County Libraries, a member of the Peninsula Library System, operates the Pacifica-Sanchez Library and the Pacifica-Sharp Park Library.

Notable residents
 Keith Hernandez MVP Baseball player and World Series Champion for the St. Louis Cardinals and New York Mets.
 Rob Schneider grew up in Pacifica. In 1997, he formed the Rob Schneider Music Foundation to support its school music program, and has since donated approximately $2 million.
 In 1971, Pacifica gained worldwide attention as the popular St. Peter's Catholic priest, Father Bob Duryea, was excommunicated, after a defiant confrontation with the church, for being married.
 Anthony Gordon former college football player for the Washington State Cougars and current free agent in the National Football League grew up in Pacifica. 
 Greg Reynolds former MLB pitcher for the Colorado Rockies, as well as uncle of Anthony Gordon (American football) grew up in Pacifica, and had his start pitching for Terra Nova, and continued to Stanford University.

Sister city
 Balaguer, Catalonia, Spain

See also

 :Category:People from Pacifica, California

References

External links

 
 Pacifica Historical Society
 City of Pacifica Commissions, Committees, and City Council meeting agendas
 Pacifica Public Libraries (Sharp Park and Sanchez) - branches of the San Mateo County Library
 Open Directory Project, Pacifica links

 
Cities in San Mateo County, California
Cities in the San Francisco Bay Area
Populated coastal places in California
Incorporated cities and towns in California
Populated places established in 1957
1957 establishments in California